is a Japanese former sumo wrestler. He was born in Tokyo, but brought up in Kajiki, Aira District, Kagoshima, Japan. He fought out of Izutsu stable. The highest rank he reached was sekiwake. Despite his relatively light weight he had an extremely long career, spanning 23 years from 1979 until 2002, and was known as the "iron man" of sumo. He is now the owner of Shikoroyama stable.

Sumo family
Terao has a long sumo pedigree. His paternal grandfather was a cousin of Satsumanishiki (former makushita). His father married the adopted daughter of former makushita Kaganishiki, who was adopted by Nishinoumi, the 25th yokozuna. His cousin is Tsurunofuji (former jūryō). Terao and his brothers Kakureizan and Sakahoko together hold various sumo records: they are the first three brothers ever to reach sekitori status; in September 1986 Terao and Sakahoko were the first brothers to win prizes together; and in March 1989 they were the first brothers to hold sekiwake rank simultaneously. In November 1990 they appeared together in Chiyonofuji's ring-entering ceremony as sword-bearer and dew-sweeper.

Career

He took up sumo shortly after his mother died of cancer. He joined Izutsu stable, which was run by his father, alongside his two brothers. He started competing under the name Terao Setsuo (寺尾 節男) after his mother's maiden name Setsuko Terao (寺尾 節子, Terao Setsuko).

He first entered the second jūryō division in July 1984. To mark this promotion he changed his name to Genjiyama Rikisaburō, but reverted to Terao Setsuo after a single tournament. After winning the jūryō championship in January 1985 he entered the top makuuchi division, but won only 6 bouts out of 15 and so returned to jūryō. He won the jūryō division the next tournament and so reentered makuuchi in July 1985. In September 1986 he earned nine wins and his first special prize, for Fighting Spirit. This advanced him to his then highest rank, maegashira 1.  He changed his name to Terao Tsunefumi in November 1987, on the advice of a fortune-teller. In the following tournament in January 1988, he defeated yokozuna Onokuni to earn his first kinboshi. He defeated Chiyonofuji in the January 1989 tournament and won the Outstanding Performance Award. In the next basho in March 1989, he finally made his breakthrough into the titled san'yaku ranks at sekiwake after four years in the top division, joining his brother at sumo's third highest rank.

Although Terao fought several tournaments at sekiwake he never came close to ōzeki, his best performance as sekiwake being 9–6. His last appearance in san'yaku was at komusubi rank in July 1994. In March 1995 he upset Takanohana for the only time as a yokozuna, earning his last special prize. In November 1999, at the age of 35, he defeated Musashimaru for his final kinboshi. He remained in makuuchi until May 2000 when he was finally demoted at age 37 after 90 consecutive top division tournaments. However, he managed to return to makuuchi for two tournaments in March and May 2001, becoming at 38 years and 24 days the oldest man post World War II to earn promotion to the top division. His last tournament was in September 2002, where he scored only five wins at the rank of jūryō 11 and faced certain demotion to the makushita division.

Records
Despite suffering from a heart condition, Terao enjoyed an exceptionally long and relatively injury-free career from his debut in 1979 aged 16 to his retirement in 2002 aged 39. He was referred to as the Tetsujin, or Iron Man, of sumo. Among his other nicknames were "The Eternal Typhoon," because of both his longevity and his tsuppari fighting style. After being defeated by the 18-year-old Takahanada in March 1991, which he regarded as the most disappointing loss of his career, he was determined to keep fighting for as long as possible. 

His total number of bouts is 1795, the third highest ever, his total number of makuuchi bouts (1378) is the fourth highest ever. His 860 wins are the ninth highest ever; his 938 losses were the most ever recorded until Kyokutenhō finished his career with 944 losses in 2015. When he had to sit out 1 day of the March 1997 tournament and the whole May 1997 tournament after breaking his big toe in a bout against Kyokushūzan it ended a run of 1359 bouts without absence, the sixth highest ever. 1063 of these were in makuuchi, the fourth highest ever. His 110 tournaments ranked as a sekitori (in the top two divisions) was an all-time record until it was broken by Kaiō in 2010.

Fighting style
Terao was an oshi-sumo specialist, relying on pushing and thrusting techniques, keeping his opponent away from his mawashi. He compensated by relying on his speed and agility, and was often able to use his quick reactions to outwit his heavier opponents. He was well known for his rapid series of thrusts to the chest (tsuppari), enabling him to win many of his matches by hataki-komi (the slap down), oshi-dashi (the push out) and tsuki-dashi (the thrust out). Due to his light weight he was vulnerable to defeat by yori-kiri (force out) if his opponents managed to contain him.

After retirement
He is now a toshiyori (a sumo elder) known as Shikoroyama Oyakata. In February 2004 he established Shikoroyama stable. He decided not to take any wrestlers from Izutsu stable with him, recruiting all the new stable's wrestlers himself. In January 2006 Hōmashō became his first wrestler to reach sekitori status. Hōmashō retired in January 2015, but later in that same year Seirō became the second wrestler coached by Shikoroyama to reach the top division. Shikoroyama has also produced the sekiwake Abi.

Personal life
While active Terao was friendly with fellow top division wrestlers Masurao and Kotogaume. He is a fan of J-pop. His eldest (adopted) son is actor .

Sakahoho died in September 2019, and Kakureizan in March 2020, leaving Terao as the only surviving Fukuzono brother. His own health declined in 2022, and he was unable to see his top wrestler Abi win the championship in Kyushu in November as he was hospitalized with arrhythmias.

Career record

See also
List of sumo record holders
List of sumo tournament second division champions
Glossary of sumo terms
List of past sumo wrestlers
List of sumo elders
List of sekiwake

References

External links

 Terao's basho results from January 1989
 complete biography and basho results (Japanese)
 Terao's official site (Japanese)
 Sumo Fan Magazine article Brothers in Sumo
 The Eternal Typhoon

1963 births
Living people
Japanese sumo wrestlers
Sumo people from Kagoshima Prefecture
Sekiwake